Frightmare may refer to:

Frightmare (1974 film), a Pete Walker film
Frightmare (1981 film), a horror film
Frightmare (wrestler), a professional wrestler
"Frightmare", a 1985 episode of the television detective series, C.A.T.S. Eyes.
"Frightmare" (Danny Phantom episode)
Frightmare (video game), a 1988 videogame by Cascade for C64, Spectrum and DOS
Frightmare, a Mario Party 5 minigame